GreenPAK™ is a Renesas Electronics’ family of mixed-signal integrated circuits and development tools. GreenPAK circuits are classified as configurable mixed-signal ICs. This category is characterized by analog and digital blocks that can be configured through programmable non-volatile memory. These devices also have a “Connection Matrix”, which supports routing signals between the various blocks. These devices can include multiple components within a single IC.

Also, the company developed the Go Configure™ Software Hub for IC design creation, chip emulation and programming.

History 
The GreenPAK technology was developed by Silego Technology Inc. The company was established in 2001. The GreenPAK product line was introduced in April 2010. Then, the first generation of ICs was released. Later, Silego was acquired by Dialog Semiconductor PLC in 2017. Officially, the trademark for the GreenPAK title was registered in 2019.

Currently, in the market, the sixth generation of GreenPAK ICs was already released. Over 6 billion GreenPAK ICs have been shipped to Dialog's customers all over the world.

In 2021, Dialog was acquired by Renesas Electronics, therefore the GreenPAK technology is currently officially owned by Renesas.

GreenPAK Integrated Circuits 
There are a few categories of ICs developed within the GreenPAK technology:

 Dual Supply GreenPAK – provides level translation from either higher or lower voltage domains.
 GreenPAK with Power Switches – includes both single power switch and dual power switch up to 2A.
 GreenPAK with Asynchronous State Machine – gives an opportunity to develop customized state machine IC designs.
 GreenPAK with Low Power Dropout Regulators – enables a user to divide power loads using the special concept of “Flexible Power Islands” devoted to wearable devices.
 GreenPAK with In-System Programmability – can be reprogrammed up to 1000 times using the I2C serial interface.
 Automotive GreenPAK – allows multiple system functions in a single IC used for automotive circuit designs.
 GreenPAK with High Voltage Features – contains both mixed-signal logic and high-voltage H-bridge functionality.

GreenPAK Designer Software 
GreenPAK Designer Software is a free GUI-based platform that enables users to create IC designs without any programming language prior skills.

The software functions include:

 Access to a library of GreenPAK ICs with a description of available elements for each device as well as to example application cases and technical documentation
 Designing integral circuits using schematic-oriented capturing of elements and their connection
 Simulation of created designs
 Samples programming

Development Tools 
There are two development boards that allow engineers to conduct different procedures mentioned in the table below.

The development boards are compatible with different sets of GreenPAK ICs that can be checked on Dialog Semiconductor's website.

Circuit Design Applications 
Over 300 application notes were developed to showcase IC designs created in the GreenPAK Designer Software and provide full instructions of the projects.

Origin of the Title 
The first part of the title “GreenPAK” indicates that the circuits function in a “green” eco-friendly manner. Their low power consumption and less lead used to produce the IC let the products diminish its negative effect on nature. The suffix “PAK” is an acronym for “Programmable Analog Kit”, indicating the goal of this device family to provide a set of analog resources (as well as digital resources), that can be used to solve a variety of real-world application problems

See also 

 Configurable mixed-signal IC
 Silego Technology Inc.
 Dialog Semiconductor PLC

References 



Integrated circuits
Application-specific integrated circuits